Apostolo Zeno (11 December 1668 in Venice – 11 November 1750 in Venice) was a Venetian poet, librettist, journalist, and man of letters.

Early life

Apostolo Zeno was born in Venice to a colonial branch of the Zeno family, an ancient Venetian patrician family. His family had been transplanted from Venice to the Kingdom of Candia in the 13th century in order to maintain Venetian order and suppress any rebellious subjects. Following the assault on the island by the Ottoman Empire, the remaining members of his family returned to Venice. Upon return they were not readmitted to the patrician class, but were only able to obtain status as ordinary citizens. His father was Pietro Zeno, a doctor of medicine, and his mother, Caterina Sevasto, belonged to an illustrious and powerful family from Candia, Crete.

Having lost his father at an early age, he was left to the care of his mother, who remarried to Venetian senator Pier Antonio Cornaro. His education was entrusted to the Somaschi Fathers.

He was in 1691 among the founders of the Accademia degli Animosi. In 1695, he composed his first libretto, Gli inganni felici, which obtained great success, making him a fashionable librettist. From 1705, he worked with Pietro Pariati, keeping the theatrical scenes for himself and leaving to Pariati the composition of the libretti.

Works 

He began work as a literary journalist for the Galleria di Minerva, also taking upon executive responsibilities, but distanced himself when he realized that he had not succeeded in making the impact upon the publication that he intended. In the end he described it as an idiocy.

In 1700 Zeno provided a translation of Pierre Le Lorrain de Vallemont's Les éléments de l'histoire (1696) for the benefit of Italians. In the preface of his translation he called for a returmn to the historiographical models that had been authoritative during the Renaissance: namely, Machiavelli and Guicciardini.

In 1702 Zeno found the perfect opportunity to put his theories into practice. The Mappamondo istorico or universal history of Jesuit rhetorician and historian Antonio Foresti had been left unfinished at its author's death in 1692. One of the most thorough works of its kind, it had already run into 6 volumes, covering ancient Greece, Rome, Persia, the popes and the Holy Roman Empire. That made it far more comprehensive than such recent one-volume essays in the genre as Walter Raleigh's History of the World (1652), Georgius Hornius's Orbis politicus (1668), Samuel von Pufendorf's Einleitung zu der Historie der vornehmsten Reiche (1684) or Peter Heylyn's Cosmography (1689). It was even longer than the last important Italian essay, Giovanni Tarcagnota's five-volume Delle istorie del mondo (1580). Now it was to be completed and republished by the Venetian firm of Girolamo Albrizzi. Adopting the approach of Tarcagnota's early seventeenth-century editors, later repeated by William Temple in 1695 for a History of England, Albrizzi assigned the new sections to a team of expert writers. He gave Egypt to Domenico Suarez of Mantua, China to Vittore Silvio Grandi of Venice; and he gave England, Scotland, Denmark, Sweden, the Duchy of Holstein and the counties of Guelders to Apostolo Zeno. The finished work promised to fill an important gap in popular historiography and to achieve considerable sales among educated readers. In scholarship, Zeno far outdid Foresti, who was not above repeating the popular myth about the fall of Belisarius (already rejected by the sixteenth-century historian Crinitus). He aso outdid the rest of the collaborators. Unlike them, he followed the Renaissance humanists in discarding the awkward Christianized version of the Book of Daniel's four-monarchy scheme, which divided universal history into the periods of Babylon, Persia, Greece, and Rome, distantly succeeded by the kingdom of heaven. He didn't treat the Holy Roman Empire as the logical extension of Rome into the modern world, so he could quletly divide the section on the third monarchy into separate volumes on each of the Northern kingdoms. And in order to avoid the dizzying complexities of a straight narrative presentation of hundreds of years of documented history, he followed Renaissance historian Paolo Emilio – who wrote on France – in adopting the Suetonian model of a series of biographies.

In 1710 together with Scipione Maffei, Antonio Vallisneri and his brother, Pier Caterino Zeno, he founded the Giornale de' letterati d'Italia, maintaining that it was necessary that "Italians themselves make their own newspaper... revealing that good sense, erudition and ingenuity never were lacking among us, and now more than ever are they flourishing."

The tri-monthly publication had prestigious contributors such as Scipione Maffei, Antonio Vallisneri, Eustachio Manfredi, Ludovico Antonio Muratori, Giovanni Battista Morgagni, Giovan Battista Vico, Bernardino Ramazzini. Motivated above all by the desire to improve Italian learning, it enjoyed considerable success.

When Apostolo Zeno was called to duty as poet laureate to the imperial court of Vienna in 1718, his brother, Pier Caterino took over the direction until 1732, publishing the periodical annually. Apostolo remained in Vienna until 1729, at which point he was replaced by Pietro Metastasio. He returned to Venice, dedicating himself to works of erudition and to coin-collecting.

Zeno wrote the libretti for 36 operas with historical and mythological themes, including Gli inganni felici (1695), Odoardo (1695) Faramondo (1698), Lucio Vero, Imperatore di Roma (1700), Griselda (1701), Temistocle (1701), Merope (1711,  Edition, 1727), L'Ambleto (1712), Alessandro Severo (1716),  T'Euzzone (1719), Ormisda (1721), Artaserse (1724), Semiramide (1725), Domenico Sarro's Il Valdemaro (1726), Astarto (1730), Caio Fabbricio (1733), Euristeo (published 1757), and Sesostri re d'Egitto (Prague edition 1760) as well as 17 oratorios, including Giuseppe (1722), Gioaz (1726), David umiliato (1731). Among his literary works, the Dissertazioni vossiane are additions and corrections to De historicis latinis by Voss. His Annotazioni to the Biblioteca della eloquenza italiana by Giusto Fontanini were published posthumously. His correspondence (Epistolario) is ample.

Critical evaluation 

From condemnation of the unrealistic and exaggerated elements of melodrama was born a demand for greater verisimilitude in plots and for literary dignity in texts. Zeno was the first to undertake reform to make melodrama more sober, according to the arcadici principles, developed further by Metastasio. Inspired by French tragedians, he respected, as they did, the rule of the unity of time and space. He reduced the number of characters and scenes and eliminated the clown roles, constructing his works so that they could be presented also without music.

Francesco de Sanctis, referring to Metastasio, wrote that "if we look at the structure, his drama is constructed in the fashion which Apostolo Zeno already demonstrated. But the structure is only a simple skeleton. Metastasio breathed into that skeleton the grace and the romance of a happy and harmonious life. He was the poet of melodrama; Zeno was the architect."

References

External links
 

1669 births
1750 deaths
Italian poets
Italian male poets
Italian opera librettists
Apostolo
18th-century Venetian writers
Italian male dramatists and playwrights
18th-century Italian journalists
17th-century journalists